Tatiana Stepovaya (born 23 September 1965 in Krasnodar, also Tatiana Stepovaya-Dianchenko) is a Russian chess player who holds the title of the FIDE title of Woman Grandmaster (WGM).

Chess career
Stepovaya was Russian Women's Champion in 1987, 1988 and 1989. Many international chess tournament winner: divided the first place with Alisa Galliamova in Rostov-on-Don (1995), won in Tallinn (2002) and won Elisaveta Bykova Memorial in Vladimir (2006). In 2000 in Batumi Stepovaya reached inaugural European Individual Women Chess Championship semi-final, where lost to Natalia Zhukova, and together with the Women's World Chess ex-Champion Maia Chiburdanidze divided 3rd-4th place. In 2001 Stepovaya with Yugoslavian chess club Agrouniverzal Zemun won the European Chess Club Cup for women.

Stepovaya has played for Russia in three Chess Olympiads (1992, 1998-2000). She won team silver (1998) and bronze (2000) medals, and individual gold and silver (both 1998) medals.

References

External links

Tatiana_Stepovaia chess games at 365Chess.com

1965 births
Chess woman grandmasters
Russian female chess players
Soviet female chess players
Sportspeople from Krasnodar
Chess Olympiad competitors
Living people